not to be confused with his grandson Laszlo Szapáry.

Count László Szapáry de Szapár, Muraszombat et Széchy-Sziget (22 November 1831 – 28 September 1883) was a Hungarian nobleman and a general of the Austrian Imperial Army.

Early life 
Born into the prominent Hungarian House of Szapáry, he was the fourth son of Count Ferenc Szapáry de Muraszombath, Széchysziget et Szapár (1804-1875) and his wife, Countess Rozália Almásy de Zsadány et Török-Szent-Miklós (1806-1887).

Biography 
He entered in service during the 1848 revolutions when he fought in Italy. Later he also participated in the Second Italian War of Independence, particularly in the Battle of Solferino. Szapáry played a leading role in the Austro-Hungarian occupation of Bosnia and Herzegovina in 1878.

Personal life 
On 28 April 1862, he married Countess Marianne von Grünne (1835-1906), daughter of Count Karl Ludwig von Grünne and his wife, Countess Caroline of Trauttmansdorff-Weinsberg (1808-1886), granddaughter of Prince Ferdinand von Trauttmansdorff-Weinsberg. Together they had four children: 
 Count Károly István László Szapáry (1864-1878)
 Countess Ferdinándina Szapáry (1867-1892); unmarried 
 Count Frigyes Szapáry (1869-1935) 
 Countess Ilona Szapáry (1877-1884)

External links
László Szapáry genealogy

1831 births
1883 deaths
Nobility from Budapest
Laszlo
Military personnel from Budapest